California's 15th State Senate district is one of 40 California State Senate districts. It is currently represented by Democrat Dave Cortese of San Jose.

District profile 
The district encompasses most of Silicon Valley, centered on the city of San Jose. It forms the focal point of the San Francisco Bay Area's South Bay region.

Santa Clara County – 52.1%
 Campbell
 Cupertino
 Los Gatos
 Monte Sereno
 San Jose – 76.3%
 Saratoga

Election results from statewide races

List of senators 
Due to redistricting, the 15th district has been moved around different parts of the state. The current iteration resulted from the 2011 redistricting by the California Citizens Redistricting Commission.

Election results 1992 - present

2020

2016

2012

2008

2004

2000

1996

1992

See also 
 California State Senate
 California State Senate districts
 Districts in California

References

External links 
 District map from the California Citizens Redistricting Commission

15
Government of Santa Clara County, California
Government in the San Francisco Bay Area